Jornal de Angola was the only daily newspaper in Angola until 2008 and after the independence of the country in 1975.

The newspaper's executive editor is Diogo Paixão. The organization uses wire feeds from ANGOP, Agence France-Presse, Reuters, EFE, and Prensa Latina. The newspaper is published in Luanda by Edições Novembro. In addition to the printed newspaper, it has an online edition.

References 

Mass media in Angola
Portuguese-language newspapers
1975 establishments in Angola
Newspapers established in 1975